Roger Korte (born October 11, 1970) is a Canadian curler from Saskatoon, Saskatchewan.  He plays second for the Darrell McKee rink. Korte is a three-time provincial champion.

Korter is a long-time member of his brother, Bruce's rink, playing every position for him except skip. In 2009, team mate Darell McKee took over the reins. Roger played in both the 2000 and 2004 Briers as Bruce's second. In 2010, he plays second from McKee.

Korte was also the team's second when they won a Grand Slam title in 2002, winning the Masters of Curling.

External links
 

1970 births
Curlers from Saskatoon
Living people